Eupithecia landryi is a moth in the family Geometridae. It is found in the coastal valleys of the northern desert of Chile.

The length of the forewings is about 5.9 mm for males. The fore- and hindwings are reddish brown with scattered dark brown scales. Adults have been recorded on wing in January.

Etymology
The species is named in honor of Dr. Bernard Landry.

References

Moths described in 2011
landryi
Moths of South America
Endemic fauna of Chile